The Battle of Kings Mountain was a military engagement between Patriot and Loyalist militias in South Carolina during the Southern Campaign of the American Revolutionary War, resulting in a decisive victory for the Patriots. In what is now rural Cherokee County, South Carolina, the Patriot militia defeated the Loyalist militia commanded by British Major Patrick Ferguson of the 71st Foot. The battle has been described as "the war's largest all-American fight".

Ferguson had arrived in North Carolina in early September 1780 to recruit troops for the Loyalist militia and protect the flank of Lord Cornwallis's main force. Ferguson challenged Patriot militias to lay down their arms or suffer the consequences. In response, the Patriot militias led by Benjamin Cleveland, James Johnston, William Campbell, John Sevier, Joseph McDowell and Isaac Shelby rallied to attack Ferguson and his forces.

Receiving intelligence on the oncoming attack, Ferguson decided to retreat to the safety of Lord Cornwallis's army. However, the Patriots caught up with the Loyalists at Kings Mountain near the border with South Carolina. Achieving a complete surprise, the Patriot militiamen attacked and surrounded the Loyalists, inflicting severe casualties. After an hour of battle, Ferguson was fatally shot while trying to break the Patriot line, after which his men surrendered. Some Patriots gave no quarter until their officers re-established control over their men; they were said to be seeking revenge for alleged killings by Banastre Tarleton's militiamen at the Battle of Waxhaws, under the slogan "Remember Tarleton's Quarter". Although victorious, the Patriots had to retreat quickly from the area for fear of Cornwallis' advance. Later they executed nine Loyalist prisoners after a short trial.

The battle was a pivotal event in the Southern campaign. The surprising victory of the American Patriot militia over the Loyalists came after a string of Patriot defeats at the hands of Lord Cornwallis, and greatly raised the Patriots' morale. With Ferguson dead and his Loyalist militia destroyed, Cornwallis was forced to abandon his plan to invade North Carolina and retreated into South Carolina.

Prelude
Major Patrick Ferguson was appointed Inspector of Militia on May 22, 1780. His task was to march to the old Tryon County area, raise and organize Loyalist units from the Tory population of the Carolina backcountry, and protect the left flank of Lord Cornwallis' main body at Charlotte, North Carolina.

Battle of Musgrove's Mill 
On the morning of August 18, 1780, two hundred mounted Patriot partisans under joint command of Colonels Isaac Shelby, James Williams, and Elijah Clarke prepared to raid a Loyalist camp at Musgrove's Mill, which controlled the local grain supply and guarded a ford of the Enoree River. The Battle of Musgrove Mill occurred on August 19, 1780, near a ford of the Enoree River, near the present-day border between Spartanburg, Laurens and Union Counties in South Carolina. The Patriots anticipated surprising a garrison of about an equal number of Loyalists, but a local farmer informed them that the Tories had recently been reinforced by about a hundred Loyalist militia and two hundred provincial regulars on their way to join British Major Patrick Ferguson. The whole battle took perhaps an hour; within that period, sixty-three Tories were killed, an unknown number wounded, and seventy were taken prisoner. The Patriots lost only about four dead and twelve wounded.

Some Whig leaders briefly considered attacking the Tory stronghold at Ninety Six, South Carolina; but they hurriedly dispersed after learning that a large Patriot army had been defeated at Camden three days previous.

Pursuit of Shelby 
Shelby's forces covered sixty miles with Ferguson in hot pursuit before making their escape. In the wake of General Horatio Gates' blundering defeat at Camden, the victory at Musgrove Mill heartened the Patriots and served as further evidence that the South Carolina backcountry could not be held by the Tories.

Shelby and his Overmountain Men crossed back over the Appalachian Mountains and retreated back into the territory of the Watauga Association at Sycamore Shoals in present day Elizabethton, Tennessee, and by the next month on September 25, 1780, Colonels Shelby, John Sevier, and Charles McDowell and their 600 Overmountain Men had combined forces with Col. William Campbell and his 400 Virginia men at the Sycamore Shoals muster in advance of the Battle of Kings Mountain north of present day Blacksburg, South Carolina in North Carolina on October 7, 1780.

On September 2, Ferguson and the militia he had already recruited marched west in pursuit of Shelby toward the Appalachian Mountain hill country on what is now the Tennessee/North Carolina border. By September 10, Ferguson had established a base camp at Gilbert Town, North Carolina and, according to Shelby issued a challenge to the Patriot leaders to lay down their arms or he would "lay waste to their country with fire and sword".

North Carolina Patriot militia leaders Isaac Shelby and John Sevier, from the Washington District (now northeast Tennessee), met and agreed to lead their militiamen against him.

Muster at Sycamore Shoals 
Patriot leaders also sent word to a Virginia militia leader, William Campbell, asking him to join them at Sycamore Shoals. Campbell called on Benjamin Cleveland to bring his Wilkes County, North Carolina militia to the rendezvous. The detachments of Shelby, Sevier and Campbell were met by 160 North Carolina militiamen led by Charles McDowell and his brother Joseph. Campbell's cousin, Arthur Campbell, brought 200 more Virginians. About 1,100 volunteers from southwest Virginia and today's northeast Tennessee, known as the "Overmountain Men" because they had settled into the wilderness west of the Appalachian Mountains ridgeline, mustered at the rendezvous on September 25, 1780, at Sycamore Shoals near the modern city of Elizabethton, Tennessee. Their movement had been made possible by easing tensions with the Cherokee, thanks to diplomacy by Benjamin Cleveland's brother-in-law, Indian agent Joseph Martin. The Overmountain Men crossed Roan Mountain the next day, and proceeded in a southerly direction for about thirteen days in anticipation of fighting the British Loyalist forces. By September 30, they had reached Quaker Meadows in Burke County, North Carolina, the home of the McDowell brothers, where they united with Benjamin Cleveland and 350 men. Now 1400 strong, the Patriots marched to South Mountain, North Carolina. The five colonels leading the Patriot force (Shelby, Sevier, William Campbell, Joseph McDowell and Cleveland) chose William Campbell as the nominal commander, but they agreed that all five would act in council to command their combined army.

Meanwhile, two deserters from the Patriot militia reached Patrick Ferguson and informed him of the large body of militia advancing towards him. Waiting three days for reasons that are still unclear, Ferguson ordered a retreat to Lord Cornwallis and the British main forces in Charlotte, sending a message to Cornwallis requesting reinforcements. The request did not reach Cornwallis until one day after the battle. On October 1, Ferguson reached North Carolina's Broad River, where he issued another pugnacious public letter, calling the local militia to join him lest they be "pissed upon by a set of mongrels" (the Overmountain Men).

On October 4, the Patriot militia reached Ferguson's former camp at Gilbert Town, where thirty Georgia militiamen joined them, anxious for action. On October 6, they reached Cowpens, South Carolina (site of the future Battle of Cowpens), where they received word that Ferguson was east of them, heading towards Charlotte and Cornwallis. They hurried to catch him. American spies reported Ferguson was making camp on Kings Mountain with some 1200 men. Ferguson, rather than pushing on until he reached Charlotte and safety (just a day's march away), camped at Kings Mountain and sent Cornwallis another letter asking for reinforcements. Kings Mountain is one of many rocky forested hills in the upper Piedmont, near the border between North and South Carolina. It is shaped like a footprint with the highest point at the heel, a narrow instep, and a broad rounded toe. The Loyalists camped on a ridge west of Kings Pinnacle, the highest point on Kings Mountain.

Needing to hurry, the Patriot militia put 900 men on horseback and rode for Kings Mountain. They left immediately, marching through the night of the 6th and morning of the 7th, even though the rain never stopped. By sunrise of the 7th, they forded the Broad River, fifteen miles from Kings Mountain. By early afternoon they arrived and immediately surrounded the ridge and attacked.

Battle

The battle opened about 3 p.m., when the 900 Patriots (including John Crockett, father of Davy Crockett) approached the steep base of the western ridge. They formed eight detachments of 100 to 200 men each. Ferguson was unaware that the Patriots had caught up to him and his 1,100 men. He was the only regular British soldier in the command, composed entirely of Loyalist Carolina militia, except for the 100 or so red-uniformed Provincials (enlisted colonials) from New York. He had not thought it necessary to fortify his camp.

The Patriots caught the Loyalists by surprise. Loyalist officer Alexander Chesney later wrote he did not know the Patriots were anywhere near them until the shooting started. As the screaming Patriots charged up the hill, Dutch-American Loyalist Captain Abraham de Peyster turned to Major Ferguson and said, "These things are ominous – these are the damned yelling boys!" Two parties, led by Colonels John Sevier and William Campbell, assaulted the mountain's "heel"—the smallest in area, but its highest point. The other detachments, led by Colonels Shelby, Williams, Lacey, Cleveland, Hambright, Winston and McDowell, attacked the main Loyalist position, surrounding the "ball" base beside the "heel" crest of the mountain.

No one in the Patriot army held command once the fighting started. Each detachment fought independently under the previously agreed-to plan to surround and destroy the Loyalists. The Patriots crept up the hill and fired from behind rocks and trees. Ferguson rallied his troops and launched a desperate bayonet charge against Campbell and Sevier. Lacking bayonets, the Patriots ran down the hill and into the woods. Campbell soon rallied his troops, returned to the hill, and resumed firing. Ferguson ordered two more bayonet charges during the battle. This became the pattern of the battle; the Patriots would charge up the hill, then the Tories would charge down the hill with fixed bayonets, driving the Patriots off the slopes and into the woods. Once the charge was spent and the Tories returned to their positions, the Patriots would reform in the woods, return to the base of the hill, and charge up the hill again. During one of the charges, Colonel Williams was killed, and Colonel McDowell was wounded. Firing was difficult for the Loyalists, since the Patriots constantly moved using cover and concealment to their advantage. Furthermore, the downhill angle of the hill contributed to the Loyalists overshooting their marks.

After an hour of combat, Loyalist casualties were heavy. Ferguson rode back and forth across the hill, blowing a silver whistle he used to signal charges. Shelby, Sevier and Campbell reached the top of the hill behind the Loyalist position and attacked Ferguson's rear. The Loyalists were driven back into their camp, where they began to surrender. Ferguson drew his sword and hacked down any small white flags that he saw popping up, but he appeared to know that the end was near. In an attempt to rally his faltering men, Ferguson shouted out "Hurrah, brave boys, the day is ours!" He gathered a few officers together and tried to cut through the Patriot ring, but Sevier's men fired a volley and Ferguson was shot and dragged by his horse behind the Patriot line. There he was confronted by an opposing Patriot officer, who demanded a surrender from the major. Ferguson shot and killed the man with his pistol in a final act of defiance, but was immediately shot dead by multiple Patriots on the spot. When the Patriots recovered his corpse, they counted seven bullet wounds.

Seeing their leader fall, the Loyalists began to surrender. Some Patriots did not want to take prisoners, as they were eager to avenge the Battle of Waxhaws or 'Tarleton's Quarter', in which Banastre Tarleton's forces killed a sizable number of Abraham Buford's Continental soldiers after the latter raised the white flag of surrender. (At Waxhaws, Tarleton's horse was shot, pinning him to the ground and leading his men to believe their commanding officer had been killed under a white flag of surrender.) Also, other Patriots were seemingly unaware that the Loyalists were trying to surrender.

Loyalist Captain de Peyster, in command after Ferguson was killed, sent out an emissary with a white flag, asking for quarter. For several minutes, the Patriots rejected de Peyster's white flag and continued firing, many of them shouting, "Give 'em Tarleton's Quarter!" and "Give them Buford's play!" A significant number of the surrendering Loyalists were killed or wounded including the white flag emissary. When de Peyster sent out a second white flag, a few of the Patriot officers, including Campbell and Sevier, ran forward and took control by ordering their men to cease fire. They took about 700 Loyalist prisoners.

Aftermath

The Battle of Kings Mountain lasted 65 minutes. The Loyalists suffered 290 killed, 163 wounded, and 668 taken prisoner. The Patriot militia suffered 28 killed and 60 wounded. The Patriots had to move out quickly for fear that Cornwallis would advance to meet them. Loyalist prisoners well enough to walk were herded to camps several miles from the battlefield. The dead were buried in shallow graves and wounded were left on the field to die. Ferguson's corpse was later reported to have been desecrated and wrapped in oxhide before burial. Both victors and captives came near to starvation on the march due to a lack of supplies in the hastily organized Patriot army.

On October 20, the retreating Patriot force held drumhead courts-martial of Loyalists on various charges (treason, desertion from Patriot militias, incitement of Indian rebellion). Passing through the Sunshine community in what is now Rutherford County, North Carolina, the retreat halted on the property of the Biggerstaff family. Aaron Biggerstaff, a Loyalist, had fought in the battle and been mortally wounded. His brother Benjamin was a Patriot and was being held as a prisoner-of-war on a British ship docked at Charleston, South Carolina. Their cousin John Moore was the Loyalist commander at the earlier Battle of Ramsour's Mill (modern Lincolnton, North Carolina), in which many of the combatants at Kings Mountain had participated on one side or the other.

While stopped on the Biggerstaff land, the American Patriots convicted 36 Loyalist prisoners. Some were testified against by Patriots who had previously fought alongside them and later changed sides. Nine of the prisoners were hanged before Isaac Shelby brought an end to the proceedings. Many of the Patriots dispersed over the next few days, while all but 130 of the Loyalist prisoners escaped while being led in single file through woodlands. The column finally made camp at Salem, North Carolina.

Lieutenant Anthony Allaire, a New York Loyalist attached to Ferguson's unit, was captured at the battle and endured the forced march and mistreatment of prisoners.  He eventually escaped and was able to make his way back to British forces in Charleston, SC. His published diary gives an account of the months leading up to the battle, a brief account of the battle itself, his time as a prisoner of Patriot forces, and his eventual escape.

Kings Mountain was a pivotal moment in the history of the American Revolution. Coming after a series of disasters and humiliations in the Carolinas—the fall of Charleston and capture of the American army there, the destruction of another American army at the Battle of Camden, the Waxhaws Massacre—the surprising decisive victory at Kings Mountain was a great boost to Patriot morale. The Tories of the Carolina back country were broken as a military force. Additionally, the destruction of Ferguson's command and the looming threat of Patriot militia in the mountains caused Lord Cornwallis to cancel his plans to invade North Carolina; he instead evacuated Charlotte and retreated to South Carolina. He would not return to North Carolina until early 1781, when he was chasing Nathanael Greene after the Americans had dealt British forces another defeat at the Battle of Cowpens.

In The Winning of the West, Theodore Roosevelt wrote of Kings Mountain, "This brilliant victory marked the turning point of the American Revolution." Thomas Jefferson called it "The turn of the tide of success". President Herbert Hoover at Kings Mountain said,

In 1931, the Congress of the United States created the Kings Mountain National Military Park at the site of the battle. The park headquarters is in Blacksburg, South Carolina, and hosts hundreds of thousands of people each year.

See also

 List of American Revolutionary War battles
 American Revolutionary War § War in the South. Places the Battle of Kings Mountain in overall sequence and strategic context.

Footnotes

References

Further reading
 The 1780 Diary of Loyalist Lieutenant Anthony Allaire of King's Mountain; Tennessee GenWeb online.
 
 
 
 Every Insult and Indignity: The Life, Genius and Legacy of Major Patrick Ferguson; Every Insult & Indignity online; Blog.

External links
 
 Roan Mountain (Tennessee) Citizens Club – Overmountain Men Celebration
 Lord Cornwallis and Major Ferguson NC state signs (offered by the American Revolutionary War Living History Center) with annual events held by the Town of Grover where Major Ferguson is celebrated as having camped and a NC state historical marker exists for such
 

1780 in the United States
Kings Mountain
Kings Mountain
Kings Mountain, North Carolina
North Carolina in the American Revolution
Kings Mountain
Tennessee in the American Revolution
York County, South Carolina
1780 in North Carolina